Marrin is a surname. Notable people with the surname include:

Albert Marrin (born 1936), American historian, professor of history, and author
Charles C. Marrin (1868 –1950), American lawyer, politician, and judge
Megan Marrin, American painter
Peter Marrin (born 1953), Canadian ice hockey player

See also
Marin (name)